Mali competed at the 2022 World Aquatics Championships in Budapest, Hungary from 18 June to 3 July.

Swimming

Malian swimmers have achieved qualifying standards in the following events:

References

Nations at the 2022 World Aquatics Championships
Mali at the World Aquatics Championships
World Aquatics Championships